The Miami Inferno was a professional indoor football team which was a member of the Ultimate Indoor Football League (UIFL). Based in Coral Gables, Florida, the Inferno played some of their home games at the BankUnited Center on the campus of the University of Miami. They were the latest indoor/arena football team to play in the Miami area after the Miami Hooters Florida Bobcats of the Arena Football League, who played from 1993 to 2001. Cade Kretuer, son of Chad Kreuter was made back up QB prior to the start of the 2014 season. The Inferno were owned by Chad and Amber Dittman. The UIFL suspended the Miami Inferno on July 12, 2014. All remaining games of the 2014 season were forfeited.

Head coaches

Season-by-season results

References

External links
 Official site of the Miami Inferno

American football teams in Miami
American football teams in Florida
Defunct American football teams in Florida
Ultimate Indoor Football League teams
Coral Gables, Florida
American football teams established in 2013
American football teams disestablished in 2014
2013 establishments in Florida
2014 disestablishments in Florida